Karl Rudolf Werner Braune (11 April 1909 − 7 June 1951) was a German SS functionary during the Nazi era and a Holocaust perpetrator. During the German invasion of the Soviet Union of 1941, Braune was the commander of Einsatzkommando 11b, part of Einsatzgruppe D. Braune organized and conducted mass murders of Jews in the Army Group South Rear Area, the Reichskommissariat Ukraine (southern Ukraine and in the Crimea). For his role in these crimes, Braune was tried before an American military court in 1948 in the Einsatzgruppen trial. He was convicted, sentenced to death and executed in 1951.

Early life 
Braune attended a type of German school known as a Gymnasium and graduated in 1929 with a diploma known as an abitur. He then studied jurisprudence at the universities of Jena, Bonn, and Munich. He graduated in 1933 with a degree in civil law from the University of Jena. On 1 July 1931, at the age of 22, and while still a student, Braune joined the Nazi Party and was assigned membership number 581,277.

Nazi career 
In November 1931, Braune became a member of the Nazi paramilitary organization known as the Sturmabteilung (SA), sometimes called "stormtroopers" in English. In November 1934, he joined the SS and was assigned membership number 107,364. At the same time in 1934 Braune began working for the Nazi Security Service known as the Sicherheitsdienst (SD). In 1936, Braune was also working for the secret police organization, the Gestapo. In 1938 he became acting Gestapo leader in Münster. In 1940, he became a Gestapo chief, first in Koblenz, next in the state police office in Wesermünde and then, in May 1941, in Halle.

Einsatzgruppe commander 
From October 1941 to the beginning of September 1942, Braune was the commander of Special Detachment 11b, part of Einsatzgruppen D, which was under the command of Otto Ohlendorf, who later would be executed as a war criminal. Werner Braune's younger brother  (18 July 1910 − 30 December 1992) was the commander of Sonderkommando 4b. Under the command of Werner Braune, Special Detachment 11b carried out the massacre of Simferopol, in the Crimea, where in the course of three days from 11 to 13 December 1941 they murdered 14,300 Jews. In September 1942 Braune returned to Halle. In 1943 he was promoted to the rank of SS-Obersturmbannführer (lieutenant colonel). From 1943 through 1944, he was the leader of the German Foreign Service Academy, until, in 1945, he was sent to Norway as the commander of the Security Police (Sicherheitspolizei; SiPo) and SD.

Trial and conviction
Following the end of the war, Braune was indicted as a war criminal in the Einsatzgruppen trial that was held before the Nuremberg Military Tribunal. Braune's only defense was that he was acting under superior orders, sometimes referred to as the "Nuremberg defense". This was rejected by the court:

On 10 April 1948, Braune was sentenced to death and shortly after midnight on 7 June 1951 he was executed by hanging at Landsberg Prison. Also hanged on 7 June 1951 at Landsberg Prison were six other Nazi war criminals including Otto Ohlendorf, Erich Naumann, Paul Blobel and Oswald Pohl.

As Braune was escorted down the hallway to the gallows, he shouted "Kameraden, es lebe Deutschland!" (Comrades, long live Germany!).

Notes

References 
 Hilary Earl: The Nuremberg SS-Einsatzgruppen Trial, 1945–1958: Atrocity, Law, and History. Cambridge University Press, Cambridge 2009, .
 Norbert Frei: Vergangenheitspolitik: die Anfänge der Bundesrepublik und die NS-Vergangenheit. Beck, München 1996, .
 Ernst Klee: Das Personenlexikon zum Dritten Reich. Fischer, Frankfurt am Main 2007. . (Aktualisierte 2. Auflage)
 Trials of War Criminals Before the Nuernberg Military Tribunals Under Control Council Law No. 10, Vol. 4: United States of America vs. Otto Ohlendorf, et al. (Case 9: "Einsatzgruppen Case"). US Government Printing Office, District of Columbia 1950. In: "National Archives Microfilm Publications", NM Series 1874-1946, Microfilm Publication M936. National Archives and Record Service, Washington 1973. (Auszüge aus der Urteilsbegründung zu Werner Braune: S. 545–547.)

1909 births
1951 deaths
Executions by the United States Nuremberg Military Tribunals
People from Unstrut-Hainich-Kreis
People from Schwarzburg-Rudolstadt
Nazi Party members
SS-Obersturmbannführer
Gestapo personnel
Einsatzgruppen personnel
Holocaust perpetrators in Russia
Holocaust perpetrators in Ukraine
German people convicted of crimes against humanity
Executed people from Thuringia
Executed mass murderers